Chariesthes similis is a species of beetle in the family Cerambycidae. It was described by Stephan von Breuning in 1938. It is known from Somalia.

References

Endemic fauna of Somalia
Chariesthes
Beetles described in 1938